Senator Hatch often refers to Orrin Hatch (1934–2022) who was a U.S. Senator from Utah from 1977 to 2019.

Senator Hatch may also refer to:

Carl Hatch (1889–1963), U.S. Senator from New Mexico from 1933 to 1949
A. Gould Hatch (1896–1970), New York State Senate
Jack Hatch (born 1950), Iowa State Senate
Pamela Hatch (fl. 1990s–2000s), Maine State Senate
Thomas V. Hatch (fl. 2000s), Utah State Senate